= Inchamakinna =

Island in County Galway, Ireland

Native name: Inse Mic Cionaith
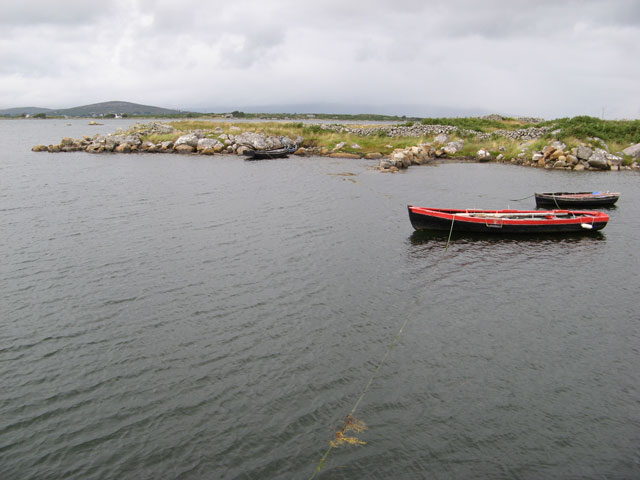
- Inchamakinna

- Location within island of Ireland

Geography
- Location: Atlantic Ocean
- Coordinates: 53°16′50″N 9°37′10″W

Administration
- Ireland
- Province: Connacht
- County: Galway

Demographics
- Population: 0 (2006)

Inchamakinna (Gaeilge:Inse Mic Cionaith) is an island in County Galway, Ireland.

== Demographics ==
Historical population

Year	Pop.	±%
1841	41	—
1851	11	−73.2%
1861	7	−36.4%
1871	7	+0.0%
1881	8	+14.3%
1891	9	+12.5%
1901	12	+33.3%
1911	9	−25.0%

Year	Pop.	±%
1926	31	+244.4%
1936	29	−6.5%
1946	36	+24.1%
1951	47	+30.6%
1956	48	+2.1%
1961	46	−4.2%
1966	47	+2.2%
1971	37	−21.3%

Year	Pop.	±%
1979	0	−100.0%
1981	0	0.00%
1986	0	0.00%
1991	0	0.00%
1996	0	0.00%
2002	0	0.00%
2006	0	0.00%

Source: Central Statistics Office. "CNA17: Population by Off Shore Island, Sex and Year". CSO.ie.
